José Zamora may refer to:

 José Rubén Zamora (born 1956), Guatemalan engineer and journalist
 José Zamora (footballer, born 1987), Peruvian football centre-back
 José Zamora (footballer, born 1988), Spanish football winger